Southdown may refer to:

 Southdown (sheep), a breed of sheep
 Southdown, Cornwall, England
 Southdown, a suburb of Harpenden, Hertfordshire, England
 Southdown, New Zealand, a suburb of Auckland
 Southdown Motor Services, a former bus company based in Sussex, England
 Southdown Power Station, a power station in Auckland
 Southdown, a cement company acquired by Cemex

See also
 South Downs, England
 South Down (disambiguation)
 Down south (disambiguation)
 HMS Southdown